"The Greatness and Perfection of Love" is a song by the English singer-songwriter Julian Cope. It is the second single released in support of his first album World Shut Your Mouth. The album version of the song is simply titled "Greatness and Perfection".

Formats and track listing 
All songs written by Julian Cope.
UK 7" single (MER 155)
"The Greatness and Perfection of Love" [remix]
"24a Velocity Crescent"

UK 12" single (MERX 155)
"The Greatness and Perfection of Love" [remix]
"24a Velocity Crescent"
"Pussyface"

Chart positions

References

External links 
 

1984 songs
1984 singles
Julian Cope songs
Song recordings produced by Stephen Lipson
Songs written by Julian Cope
Mercury Records singles